Erynnis funeralis, commonly known as the funereal duskywing, is a species of butterfly of the  family Hesperiidae. It is found from southern United States (California, Arizona, New Mexico and Texas), south to Argentina and Chile. Strays can be found north up to northern Illinois, north-eastern Nebraska, central Colorado, southern Nevada and central California.

The wingspan is 34–45 mm. They are very similar to the mournful duskywing, but can be distinguished by narrower fore wing with a light brown patch along outer edge. Their wings are black and brown with a white fringe on the hind wings. Adults are seen from February to October. 

The larvae have a black head and a green body with yellow hairs and yellow markings. Its host plant is often Medicago sativa. Larvae feed on various plants, including Robinia neomexicana, Medicago hispida, Lotus scoparius, Olneya tesota, Vicia, and Acmispon. Adults feed on flower nectar.

References

External links
Nearctica
Bug Guide
Distribution 

Erynnis
Butterflies described in 1870
Hesperiidae of South America
Butterflies of North America
Taxa named by Samuel Hubbard Scudder